George B. Willis was a state legislator in North Carolina. He represented Craven County in the North Carolina House of Representatives in 1870.

Richard Tucker and Edward R. Dudley were fellow African American state legislators from New Bern. Craven County was represented by several African Americans during the period.

He commanded Company H of the 1st North Carolina State Troops.

See also
African-American officeholders during and following the Reconstruction era
List of first African-American U.S. state legislators

References

Year of birth missing (living people)
Living people